Koirengba was a Meitei king in the early 16th century who ruled between 1507 and 1511.

See also
List of Meitei royals
Manipur (princely state)

References

External links
Hodson, Thomas Callan. The Meitheis. Harvard University, 1908.

Year of birth missing
Year of death missing
Meitei royalty
Sanamahists
Ningthoucha dynasty